Ledbetter station is a DART Light Rail station in Dallas, Texas. It is near the Intersection of Lancaster Road (SH 342) and Ledbetter Drive in the Oak Cliff neighborhood. It serves Paul Quinn College. It opened on May 31, 1997, and served as the southern terminus for the Blue Line until an extension to UNT Dallas station opened October 24, 2016.

References

External links 
 DART - Ledbetter Station

Dallas Area Rapid Transit light rail stations in Dallas
Railway stations in the United States opened in 1997
1997 establishments in Texas
Railway stations in Dallas County, Texas